Ajimudaoro Aladesanmi I was a Yoruba Oba who reigned as Ewi of Ado Ekiti in Nigeria from 1886 until 1910. He was the father of Daniel Aladesanmi II.

References 

Ajimudaora
Nigerian traditional rulers
Yoruba monarchs
People from Ekiti State